"Jealous" is a song by Filipino musician Eyedress, released on 6 December 2019 as a single from his album Let's Skip to the Wedding (2020). It first charted at number twenty four on the Billboard Hot Rock & Alternative Songs and number twenty three on the Billboard Hot Alternative Songs charts on the week of 20 February 2021, climbing to number fifteen on both charts the following week, and remaining in the Hot Rock & Alternative Songs chart for 20 weeks. It received multi-platinum certification from the RIAA for selling 2,000,000 equivalent units in the United States. The single was also certified gold in Australia and Poland and platinum in Canada.

Background
The song was written by Eyedress after he relocated to America from the Philippines. He recorded the song in his bedroom in Silver Lake, Los Angeles with a Teisco guitar.

Reception
PopMatters wrote that, on "Jealous", Eyedress "squeeze[s] all possible sonic elements together in dense melodic ostinati over simple, driving rhythms". "Jealous" appeared in The Faders Best Songs of 2020 list. "Jealous" became a viral hit in 2020, with the track featuring in over one million TikTok videos. In December 2021, TikTok reported that “Jealous” was the tenth most popular Rock/Alternative track on the platform in the USA that year.

Remix
Lex Records released a remix of "Jealous" by King Krule on March 11, 2021.  NME described the remix as "dark" and "hypnotic" and quoted King Krule saying the remix was "Recorded in sweat, last summer, for a friend."

Music videos
The music video for "Jealous", was directed by BRVINFREEZE and features Eyedress skateboarding with Kane The Menace in the Venice Beach. 

On March 11, 2020, an animated video for the King Krule Remix directed by Eyedress was released. Alternative Press  described the video as "surreal" with "a retro video game vibe" where the musicians "set off on a ’90s Nintendo-style skateboard race through a bizarre Minecraft universe."

Charts

Weekly charts

Year-end charts

Certifications

References

2020 singles
2019 songs
Eyedress songs